Willie Sauiluma (born 12 July 2000), is a Samoan international footballer who plays as a forward for the Samoa national football team and Goulburn Valley Suns.

Early life 
Sauiluma was born in Samoa but grew up in Australia. in Australia he played for Shepparton South and the Goulburn Valley Suns.

Career
In June 2016 he was selected for the Samoa national under-17 football team for the 2017 OFC U-17 Championship. He captained the squad, and was subsequently selected to attend the second round in Tahiti. In June 2019 he was named to the squad for the 2019 Pacific Games. He also appeared for the Samoa U23s at the 2019 OFC Men's Olympic Qualifying Tournament.

Career statistics

Club

Notes

International

References

External links
 

1996 births
Living people
Samoan footballers
Samoan expatriate footballers
Samoa international footballers
Association football forwards
Goulburn Valley Suns FC players
Samoan expatriate sportspeople in Australia
Expatriate soccer players in Australia
Samoa youth international footballers